Tracy Mattes (born December 13, 1969 in Milwaukee, Wisconsin) is a retired American track and field athlete and Humanitarian Activist.

In 2009 Tracy was inducted into the World Sports Humanitarian Hall of Fame, joining an elite fraternity of past inductees such as Tennis great Arthur Ashe, Olympian Jesse Owens, Gymnast Mary Lou Retton, Major League Baseball pioneer Jackie Robinson, soccer great Pelé and the Harlem Globetrotters.  Chaired by George H. W. Bush, 41st President of the United States, the Hall of Fame recognizes individuals from amateur and professional sports who distinguish themselves with their humanitarian efforts.

Tracy specialized in the 400 meter hurdles and also competed in the Modern Pentathlon for a short period of time. She served for 7 years as a UN Special Representative focusing on building small libraries in Africa, and held the position of Director of Global Programs for the World Olympians Association under the Presidency of Olympic Gold Medalist Dick Fosbury. Tracy is currently the Executive Director for the American Water Ski Educational Foundation, the headquarters of the Water Ski Hall of Fame and Museum and USA Water Ski.

References
USA Water Ski - AWSEF Welcomes New Executive Director

 World Sport Humanitarian Hall of Fame Official Press Release
 Pac-10 Sports News – Former Sun Devil Hurdler to be enshrined in the 15th annual Hall of Fame Ceremony
 Fox News   -Humanitarian Hall of Fame Induction
 Associated Press – ABC News- Humanitarian Hall of fame adds 3 inductees
 ASU's Tracy Mattes to be Inducted into World Sports Humanitarian Hall
 Three More Set to Enter Hall
 From the Office of the Mayor
 Humanitarian Hall Adds Three Members

External links

 Tracy Mattes' homepage
 World Sport Humanitarian Hall of Fame
World Olympians Association
Team Darfur: Tracy on her Trip to BeijingTeam Darfur
WOA Video Broadcast: Tracy Mattes WOA Video Diary from Mozambique
Mattes Wins Olympic Documentary Film Award

1969 births
Living people
American humanitarians
American female hurdlers
Arizona State Sun Devils women's track and field athletes
Track and field athletes from Milwaukee